The third series of Promi Big Brother started on 14 August 2015 and ended on 28 August 2015. It was the third series of the Big Brother franchise on Sat.1, after it left RTL II. 5 celebrity housemates ("promis") entered the house on Day 1 and the other 7 celebrities entered on Day 3. The show was hosted by Jochen Schropp.

Format 
Promis had participated in tasks and matches for treats or to avoid punishments. Daily nominations also took place (from Day 8 to 14). Furthermore, the house consists of two floors, the upper luxury floor and the lower poverty floor. Housemates on the luxury floor will choose of the poor housemates to join them upstairs, whilst the public will vote one of the 7 downstairs.

House
This year's Promi Big Brother contains two floors, each floor having their separate living areas, bathrooms, bedrooms and diary rooms. The upper floor will be luxurious, whilst the lower floor is meager with no beds or real seating.

Housemates 

Note:In the first Live Show the public voted whether Julia Jasmin 'JJ' Rühle or Gina-Lisa Lohfink should move in the House and decided on Julia Jasmin 'JJ' Rühle.

Duel Arena
Big Brother respectively determines a housemate of "upstairs", which must compete on the Duel Arena. This candidate from "upstairs" must choose one of the housemates of "Downstairs" who competed against him. In the Duel Arena both compete in a game and the loser must face the consequences for his residential area. With a draw always win the housemate from the "Upstairs" area.

In the broadcast of 18 August 2015, the rules are changed: One housemate from upstairs and downstairs playing for the entire team. The winning team pulls up and the loser team down. On top you get to eat again plentiful, while the inhabitants of the bottom have to feed with bread and water. Furthermore, the living conditions (such as less sleep capacities) have continued to deteriorate in the lower area. In addition, in this episode, the entire respective team determined jointly, who must compete for each area, "Up" or "Down", to a duel. A draw there would be an estimated question.

  All housemates lived after the merge at downstairs. Therefore, there were two housemates competing from the same area..

Nominations Table 
Key:
 Downstairs Housemates
 Upstairs Housemates

Notes 

: All Housemates automatically faced the public vote. However, Judith, won immunity during that night's duel.
: All Downstairs Housemates were immune from being nominated. Upstairs Housemates were forced to give their nominations face-to-face.
: All male Housemates were immune from being nominated.
: The Housemate with the most nominations had to choose with whom he or she would face the public vote. This Housemate was Nino and he chose Nina-Kristin.
: Due to Wilfried's walking from the House on Day 13, the eviction on Day 14 was cancelled. The nominations made on Day 14 rolled over to Day 15.
: The public were voting for which Housemate they wanted to win, rather than to evict.

Ratings

References

External links 
Official Homepage

2015 German television seasons
03